William H. Tuntke (September 24, 1906 – August 25, 1997) was an American art director. He was nominated for two Academy Awards in the category Best Art Direction.

Selected filmography
Tuntke was nominated for two Academy Awards for Best Art Direction:
 Mary Poppins (1964)
 The Andromeda Strain (1971)

References

External links

American art directors
1906 births
1997 deaths